Jurassic City is a 2015 American action film written, edited, and directed by Sean Cain. The film, produced by Anthony Fankhauser, stars Ray Wise, Kevin Gage, Vernon Wells, Robert LaSardo, Dana Melanie, Sofia Mattsson, Kayla Carlyle, Monique Parent, and Jack Forcinito.

The film was released direct-to-DVD on January 9, 2015 in Japan, and on February 3 in the United States. The film is a mockbuster of the Jurassic Park series.

Plot
When a top secret Black Ops facility is breached from within by genetically modified Monolophosaurus, a final shipment is re-routed to a nearby prison to secure a half dozen of the beasts.

A trio of sorority girls (who are temporary 'guests' after getting busted for high-jinx after a particularly obnoxious party) find themselves trapped in the prison when these dinosaurs escape and go on a vicious rampage killing 90% of the prison population including the guards.

Forced to team up with the remaining prisoners they find themselves pushed deeper and deeper into the bowels of the prison to find a way out. Only they aren't sure if their new 'friends' are any better than the Monolophosaurus who plan on eating them.

And to make matters worse the Black Ops organization enters the prison not only to collect their 'property', but also permanently silence anyone with knowledge of the situation.

Cast
 Ray Wise as Warden Lewis
 Kevin Gage as Doyle
 Vernon Wells as Agent LaFranco
 Robert LaSardo as Corporal Ignacio
 Dana Melanie as Pippi
 Sofia Mattsson as Stephanie
 Kayla Carlyle as Sarah
 Jack Forcinito as Captain Talbot
 Monique Parent as Scarlett
 Vanessa V. Johnston as Erika
 Kelcey Watson as Armstrong
 Timothy Muskatell as Bear
 Jimmy Williams as Manny
 Trista Robinson as Kris

References

External links
 
 

2015 films
2015 independent films
2010s fantasy adventure films
2015 action films
American action adventure films
American fantasy adventure films
American independent films
American science fantasy films
Films about dinosaurs
Mockbuster films
Films set in Los Angeles
Films shot in Los Angeles
2010s English-language films
2010s American films